Bogusława Knapczyk (born 8 April 1970, in Szczawnica) is a Polish slalom canoer who competed from the late 1980s to the mid-1990s. Competing in two Summer Olympics, she earned her best finish of 19th in the K-1 event in Barcelona in 1992.

References
Sports-Reference.com profile

1970 births
Canoeists at the 1992 Summer Olympics
Canoeists at the 1996 Summer Olympics
Living people
Olympic canoeists of Poland
Polish female canoeists
People from Nowy Targ County
Sportspeople from Lesser Poland Voivodeship
20th-century Polish women